Hotel Pullman Bucharest World Trade Center is a hotel building located in Bucharest. It has 12 floors and a surface of 18,000 m2. Its building is connected to the World Trade Center. The hotel building formerly operated under the Sofitel brand.

References

Bucharest World Trade Center
Hotel buildings completed in 1994
Skyscraper hotels in Bucharest
1994 establishments in Romania